Tojikiston (Tajikistan) is a thrice weekly newspaper published in Tajikistan. It is one of the most widely circulated papers in the country. It is written in the Tajik language.

References

Newspapers published in Tajikistan
Publications with year of establishment missing